Alice Rachele Arlanch (20 October 1995) is the beauty pageant titleholder of the Miss Italia 2017. She won the crown on 10 September 2017.

Biography 
Born in Rovereto, she studies law at the University of Trento.

References

1995 births
Living people
Italian beauty pageant winners